FC Taraz is a Kazakhstani professional football club based at the Taraz Central Stadium in Taraz. A leading club in the early years of the Kazakhstan Premier League, they were champions in 1996, and Kazakhstan Cup winners in 2004.

History
After initially being relegated from the Premier League at the end of the 2016 season, Taraz was reinstated on 3 February 2017 after the Football Federation of Kazakhstan ruled that Altai Semey did not meet the required entry requirements for the Premier League.

Names
1961 : Founded as Metallist
1967 : Renamed  Voskhod
1968 : Renamed  Energetik
1971 : Renamed  Alatau
1975 : Renamed  Khimik
1992 : Renamed  Fosfor
1994 : Renamed  Taraz

Domestic history

Continental history

Honours
Kazakhstan Premier League
Champions (1): 1996
Runner-Up: (2): 1995, 1997

Kazakhstan Cup
Winners (1): 2004
Runner-Up: (3): 1992, 1993, 2013

Current squad

Managers
 Kurban Berdyev (1986–89), (1991–92)
 Vakhid Masudov (Aug 1999 – June 00)
 Vladimir Gulyamhaydarov (2003)
 Yuri Konkov (Jan 1, 2004 – Aug 24, 2005)
 Sergei Tagiyev (2006 – May 7)
 Vladimir Fomichyov (2008–10)
 Dmitriy Ogai (Jan 1, 2010 – Nov 30, 2010)
 Igor Ursachi (June 25, 2010 – Sept 1, 2010)
 Vait Talgayev (2010–2011)
 Ljupko Petrović (Nov 1, 2011 – May 14, 2013)
 Nurmat Mirzabaev (interim) (May 16, 2013 – June 7, 2013)
 Arno Pijpers (June 8, 2013 – June 10, 2014)
 Evgeny Yarovenko (June 10, 2014 – Nov 11, 2015)
 Nurmat Mirzabayev (January – May 2016)
 Yuriy Maksymov (15 May 2016-2017)
 Vladimir Nikitenko (left in 2021)
 Vardan Minasyan (February 2, 2021 – October 26, 2021)
 Nurken Mazbayev (January 13, 2022 – October 21, 2022)
 Nurmat Mirzabayev(2022)

External links
Official site

References

 
Football clubs in Kazakhstan
Association football clubs established in 1960
1960 establishments in the Kazakh Soviet Socialist Republic